Qutub-e-Alam's  Mosque and Tomb, also known as Vatva Dargah is a medieval mosque and tomb complex in Vatva area of Ahmedabad, India.

History and architecture

Hazrat Syed Burhanuddin Qutub-ul-Alam, the father of Shah e Alam, was the grandson of Hazrat Syed Makhdoom Jahaniyan Jahangasht. Attracted to the court of Ahmad Shah I, he settled at Vatva and died there in 1452. He founded the Bukhariya sect of Gujarat. The nobles of the courts of Ahmed Shah, Sultan Qutubuddin Ahmad Shah II raised a small shrine first. Afterwards a mosque, a tomb to one of his sons, a large many-sided pond, and a vast mausoleum was built Mahmud Begada. The mosque and son's tomb are in the flat Hindu style without arches or minarets. But in the large mausoleum, with a great gain in size, the arch takes the place of the beam, and the dome is raised high in air by a second tier of arches. The arch, uniformly used with one consistent design, has much beauty and propriety. The tomb is of the most elaborate workmanship surmounted by a richly inlaid canopy. But although the building is incomplete, it wants the outer aisles and has no stone trellis work in its windows.

References 

Mosques in Ahmedabad
Monuments of National Importance in Gujarat
Tombs in Ahmedabad